Dmytro Ivanovych Bahalii was a Ukrainian historian and public and political figure, one of founding members of the National Academy of Sciences of Ukraine, and a full member of the Shevchenko Scientific Society since 1923. He was also a professor and rector at Kharkiv University (1887, 1906–1910), and mayor of Kharkiv (1914–1917).

He served as an official in the Tsarist government, and achieved the title of  Active State Councillor. Later, he became an honorary member of the Imperial Academy of Sciences, and nine universities across the Russian Empire (1906). Until 1917 he was a member of the Constitutional Democratic Party and the State Council. Following the February Revolution,  he voluntarily handed away his mayoral seat of Kharkiv to the Socialist-Revolutionary Vladimir Karelin. From the 1930s he faced repression by the Soviets.

He was the first to compile a full collection of the works of Hryhoriy Skovoroda.

Biography 
Dmitry Bagalei was born into the family of a craftsman (sadler). After teaching at the parish school and progymnasium, he was admitted to the 2nd Kyiv gymnasium and in 1876 he completed the course there with a gold medal. Then he studied at the University of St. Vladimir in Kyiv (for some time from the second semester he was forced to study at Kharkov University) and was awarded a gold medal for an essay on a given topic. After graduating from the Faculty of History and Philology (1880), he was left at the university as a scholarship holder to prepare for a professorship.

For a master's degree, he wrote: "History of the Seversk Land", reworking an essay that was awarded a gold medal.

Author of a number of articles in the Encyclopedic Dictionary of Brockhaus and Efron. In one of them, he defined Chernihiv and Poltava regions as "the core of the former Seversk land", which from the middle of the 17th to the 2nd half of the 18th century "ethnographically becomes the center of the Little Russian people."

Bagalei took an active part in the studies of the historical society of the chronicler Nestor in Kyiv and the historical and philological society in Kharkov. Was at the archaeological congresses in Odessa and Yaroslavl as a deputy from Kharkov University. At the invitation of the chief commander of the Black Sea and Azov fleets, he lectured to naval officers in Nikolaev. In order to study historical materials, he visited Chernigov and Poltava, supervised the description of the Kharkov historical archive. Conducted excavations and compiled an archaeological map of the Kharkov province (1906). One of the first explorers of the Upper Saltov site.

Since 1883, D. I. Bagaliy was a member of the Historical and Philological Society of Kharkiv University. Documentary support for the society's research was carried out by the Kharkiv Historical Archive, which was founded by Dmytro Ivanovych along with the historian and ethnographer P.S. Yefimenko. The scientist was engaged in the collection of archival materials from many collections (provincial institutions, collections of private individuals - local scientists, public figures of Kharkiv Oblast, Poltava Oblast, Chernihiv Oblast) included in the fund of the Kharkiv Historical Archive, their organization and scientific description. In 1883, the council of professors of Kharkiv University elected him the head of this archive. Subsequently, thanks to the activities of Dmytro Ivanovych and his colleagues, the archive funds grew and the Kharkiv Historical Archive became a powerful scientific base for research on the history of Slobozhanshchyna, Left Bank Ukraine, a school of historians-archivists was formed (M. Bakay, M. Plokhinskyi, O. Radakova, D. Miller, V. Barvinskyi). Thanks to D. I. Bagaliyev, the archive received subsidies and permanent premises from Kharkiv University. Dmytro Ivanovych performed the duties of the head of the Kharkiv Historical Archive for several decades free of charge. He was an honorary member of many provincial archival commissions (Tambov, 1887), Oryol (1889), Tavrii (1890), Chernihiv (1897) and others.

In 1887, D. I. Bagaliy defended his doctoral thesis "Essays on the history of the colonization of the steppe outskirts of the Moscow state" at Moscow University. In the same year, he was elected extraordinary, and in 1889 – ordinary professor of Kharkiv University. Since 1908, he has been an honored professor. While teaching history at the university, he proved himself as a hardworking and talented teacher, a persistent scientist. D. I. Bagaliy also participated in the work of many archaeological congresses (1884, 1887, 1896, 1899, 1902, 1905, 1911).

Enlightenment, democratic and humanistic ideas of Dmytro Ivanovych were implemented during many years of work at the KhGB. He was the organizer of various activities of the book collection. This work expanded his practical experience as an expert in librarianship and became the basis for the creation of a significant part of the scholar's librarianship heritage, concentrated in speeches and articles: "On the necessity of building a house for the Kharkiv public library" (1894), "On the enlightening value of the Kharkiv public library" ( 1896), "Speech at the Opening of the Branch Office of the Kharkov Public Library" (1901), "Report on the Establishment of the Department of Manuscripts and Autographs" (1903), "Note by D. I. Bagalei on the Tasks of the Kharkov Public Library" (1904), "On Methods purchase of books" (1904), "Kharkiv public library as a type of scientific and educational regional library" (1919).

The revolutionary events of February–March 1917, Dmitry Ivanovich perceived as an opportunity for the development of Ukrainian science and culture. Thanks to his activities and under pressure from the public, in the fall of 1917, several Ukrainian gymnasiums were opened in Kharkov, and permanent Ukrainian language courses for teachers were opened at the local commercial institute.

In works devoted to the Charkiv Public Library, Dmytro Ivanovych examines the historical process of its creation, provides an analysis of statistical data in the dynamics of the library's development: the number of subscribers, the quantitative and qualitative composition of the fund, the library budget, financing issues, as well as a comparative analysis of the CGB with other domestic libraries (the growth was noted library, its funds) ("On the necessity of building a house for the Kharkiv public library", "On the educational significance of the Kharkiv public library", "Kharkiv public library as a type of scientific and general educational regional library"). The scientist believes that the success of the library is due to its public character (the founding of the Library by the progressive public of the city), collegial management, democratic traditions, support for initiative, creativity. The availability of library services, the possibility of receiving free help in scientific activities is analyzed. Dmytro Ivanovych calls the library "the pride of the region", drawing attention to the need to increase allocations for its maintenance. He finds arguments in support of his proposals in the presentation of the experience of Western Europe: the understanding by local governing bodies and the public of the importance of public libraries for cities, the opening of libraries at the request of the community, the existence of relevant legislative acts on the establishment of public libraries in cities, their placement in a better place, free use of libraries . D. I. Bagaliy cites the positive experience of the USA (the presence of a state library in every state, the establishment of a large number of libraries due to donations from private individuals, high rates of book publishing). The high level of society's readiness for the spread of library services, enlightenment, education, and cultural development were for the scientist a model for distribution on the domestic territory ("On the need to build a house for the Kharkiv public library"). Turning to the historical fact of the creation of a public library in Kharkiv in the 1830s, Dmytro Ivanovych sees one of the main reasons for its neglect as the lack of such a level of readiness in the local community at that time. However, the scientist predicts the rise of the library movement and interest in reading among compatriots in the future.

D. I. Bagaliy considered one of the main tasks for the HGB to be the fulfillment of an educational function ("On the educational significance of the Kharkiv public library", "Speech at the opening of a branch office of the Kharkiv public library"). The path to implementation was the opening of a cheap third tier, the operation of a season ticket, branch offices (especially in working areas), the universality of the fund. According to the scientist, it was the nature of the library's fund that contributed to the fulfillment of the educational function: artistic, popular science, and scientific literature enabled readers to develop intellectually and spiritually, to move to a higher educational level. Recognizing the educational role of the KHGB ("On the necessity of building a house for the Kharkiv Public Library", "On the educational significance of the Kharkiv Public Library", "Report on the establishment of the Department of Manuscripts and Autographs", "Note by D. I. Bagalei on the tasks of the Kharkiv Public Library"), Dmytro Ivanovych asserted the importance of performing the functions of a scientific library by the HGB, emphasized the importance of expanding scientific departments, replenishing funds with scientific literature, forming collections of rare publications, and called the HGB a serious book repository. Dmytro Ivanovych notes the importance of the correct selection of books, primarily of a scientific nature, completeness and systematic replenishment of the fund. He considered the participation of specialists from various fields of knowledge in this process to be an important factor in quality staffing. The selection of books for the HGB funds was up to the Board: the proposals of subscribers, readers of the reading room and staff of the third-rate library were taken into account; the issue of purchasing books was discussed ("About ways to purchase books").

Since 1918 - Chairman of the Historical and Philological Department, member of the Presidium of the Ukrainian Academy of Sciences. In the 1920s, he taught the history of Ukraine at a higher school, while simultaneously researching the history of Sloboda, Left-Bank, and Southern Ukraine in the 15th-18th centuries. He was a full member of the Archaeographic Commission of the Central Archival Administration of the Ukrainian SSR, scientific editor of the journal Arkhivna Pravo.

Dmitry Ivanovich Bagalei died of pneumonia. A street in the Shevchenko district of Lviv is named after him.

Daughter - Bagalei-Tatarinova, Olga Dmitrievna, historian.

Works
 History of the Severia land until mid 14th century (1882)
 Outline of history on colonization and mode of life of steppe outskirts of the Muscovite State (Moscow 1887)
 Colonization of the Novorossiya Krai (1889)
 New historian of Malorossiya (1891)
 To the history of studies about mode of life of the Old Slavic people (1892)

See also
 List of mayors of Kharkiv

References

External links
 Herasymenko, N. Dmytro Bahalii (БАГАЛІЙ ДМИТРО ІВАНОВИЧ). Encyclopedia of History of Ukraine. 2003
 Andriy Filaniuk. Dmytro Bahalii (БАГАЛІЙ Дмитро). Encyclopedia of the Shevchenko Scientific Society. 2015

1857 births
1932 deaths
Scientists from Kyiv
Ukrainian people in the Russian Empire
People from Kievsky Uyezd
National University of Kharkiv alumni
20th-century Ukrainian historians
Full Members of the National Academy of Sciences of Ukraine
Members of the Shevchenko Scientific Society
Mayors of Kharkiv
Hromada (society) members
19th-century Ukrainian historians